Classic Jaheim Vol. 1 is the first compilation album of Jaheim released on November 25, 2008 by Warner Bros. Records.

Track listing
"Anything" (Featuring Next)
"Put That Woman First"
"Just in Case"
"Fabulous" (Featuring Tha' Rayne)
"Everytime I Think About Her (Featuring Jadakiss)
"The Chosen One"
"Could It Be"
"Diamond in da Ruff"
"Looking for Love"

Charts

Weekly charts

Year-end charts

References

Jaheim albums
2008 compilation albums
Warner Records compilation albums